General Store–Fratelli Curia–Essegibi is an Italian UCI Continental cycling team founded in 1998. The team competed domestically from 1998 through 2019, and gained UCI status in 2020.

Team roster

References

External links

UCI Continental Teams (Europe)
Cycling teams based in Italy
Cycling teams established in 1998